Michaël Pereira (born 8 December 1987) is a French professional footballer who plays as a winger for Super League Greece 2 club Apollon Smyrnis.

Club career

Early years
Pereira was born in Livry-Gargan, Seine-Saint-Denis of Cape Verdean descent. He finished his development at Le Blanc-Mesnil Sport in the commune of Le Blanc-Mesnil, competing with them in the Division d'Honneur, the sixth division of French football. In 2008, he joined UJA Alfortville in the Championnat de France amateur and, midway through the league campaign, met his agent, who exclaimed: "With the connections I have, you can have a bright future."; the player subsequently hired him, and went on to have a successful season with the latter club, appearing in 29 official games and scoring 12 goals.

Mallorca
Afterwards, Pereira went on trials with teams in France and Spain, most notably AJ Auxerre, US Boulogne, Deportivo de La Coruña and RCD Mallorca. While trialing with the Galicians during the 2008–09 season, he was invited by the president to attend a match between the hosts and FC Barcelona; however, after contemplating the decision, he decided to join Mallorca citing better opportunities.

Pereira spent his first season with the Balearic Islands side in the Segunda División B, helping the reserves to a final seventh place after promotion. Late into the campaign he was invited to practice with the first team, being included in the squad to play against CA Osasuna – hours before the match, he was offered a professional contract by club officials and was told "to be pro is what you dreamed your whole life, right? If you sign, you're playing tonight, otherwise not." However, despite the contract being professional, it still contained the same conditions of an amateur one; he subsequently turned down the offer and was an unused substitute in that fixture. The discussions continued the following day, but he remained steadfast on his decision and went two months without featuring in a competitive match.

In August 2010, following an ownership change the previous month, Pereira signed his first professional contract, agreeing to a four-year deal. On the 29th he made his first-team and La Liga debut, replacing Víctor Casadesús in 2010–11's opener, a 0–0 home draw against Real Madrid. During his first year he was first-choice right winger, also finishing as one of the side's top scorers at five goals.

On 3 September 2013, Pereira was loaned to fellow league team Granada CF in a season-long move. Mainly as a backup, he helped the Andalusians narrowly avoid relegation.

Pereira renewed his link with Mallorca on 21 August 2014, running until 2016.

Malatyaspor
On 15 July 2016, Pereira left for Turkey and signed with Yeni Malatyaspor. He scored six goals in 30 matches in his first season, as the club reached the Süper Lig for the first time in its history.

CFR Cluj
On 28 June 2019, Pereira joined CFR Cluj in the Romanian Liga I.

Club statistics

Honours
CFR Cluj
Liga I: 2019–20, 2020–21

References

External links

1987 births
Living people
People from Livry-Gargan
French sportspeople of Cape Verdean descent
French footballers
Footballers from Seine-Saint-Denis
Association football wingers
Championnat National 2 players
UJA Maccabi Paris Métropole players
La Liga players
Segunda División players
Segunda División B players
RCD Mallorca B players
RCD Mallorca players
Granada CF footballers
Süper Lig players
TFF First League players
Yeni Malatyaspor footballers
Kocaelispor footballers
Liga I players
CFR Cluj players
I liga players
Wisła Kraków players
Super League Greece 2 players
Apollon Smyrnis F.C. players
French expatriate footballers
Expatriate footballers in Spain
Expatriate footballers in Turkey
Expatriate footballers in Romania
Expatriate footballers in Poland
Expatriate footballers in Greece
French expatriate sportspeople in Spain
French expatriate sportspeople in Turkey
French expatriate sportspeople in Romania
French expatriate sportspeople in Poland
French expatriate sportspeople in Greece